Let's Rock is a 2001 song by E-Trax. It made #60 on the UK Singles Chart.

References

2001 singles
2001 songs